The canton de Soultz-Haut-Rhin is a French former administrative division, located in the département of Haut-Rhin and the region Alsace. It had 23,348 inhabitants (2012). It was disbanded following the French canton reorganisation which came into effect in March 2015.

The canton comprised the following communes:

 Berrwiller
 Bollwiller
 Feldkirch
 Hartmannswiller
 Issenheim
 Jungholtz
 Merxheim
 Raedersheim
 Soultz-Haut-Rhin (seat)
 Ungersheim
 Wuenheim

References

Former cantons of Haut-Rhin
2015 disestablishments in France
States and territories disestablished in 2015